This is the front bench of Pat Rabbitte, who led the Labour Party from 2002 until 2007.  
Rabbitte's first shadow cabinet was announced on the afternoon of Monday 4 November 2002.

 Pat Rabbitte - Leader and Northern Ireland 
 Liz McManus - Deputy Leader and Health 
 Emmet Stagg - Chief Whip and Nuclear Safety 
 Brendan Howlin - Enterprise, Trade and Employment 
 Eamon Gilmore - Environment and Local Government 
 Willie Penrose - Social and Family Affairs 
 Roisín Shortall - Transport 
 Joan Burton - Finance 
 Joe Costello - Justice 
 Jan O'Sullivan - Education 
 Kathleen Lynch - Consumer Affairs 
 Breda Moynihan Cronin - Equality and Law Reform 
 Brian O'Shea - Community, Rural and Gaeltacht Affairs 
 Michael D. Higgins - Foreign Affairs 
 Tommy Broughan - Communications, Marine and Natural Resources and Assistant Whip 
 Jack Wall - Arts, Sports and Tourism 
 Joe Sherlock - Defence 
 Mary Upton - Agriculture and Food Safety 
 Sean Ryan - Older Persons Issues 
 Seamus Pattison - Leas Ceann Comhairle

References

2002 establishments in Ireland
2002 in Irish politics
2007 disestablishments in Ireland
Rabbitte
Labour Party (Ireland)